Sanjay Nagar  is a posh residential colony, a part of Gulabi bagh Area situated in north of central Delhi. It is famous for its green cover and low population density. It houses facilities like NKS Super speciality hospital. Sanjay nagar is well connected from metro and bus routes.

Notes

Delhi